Alexander Hoffmann (born 6 March 1975) is a German politician of the Christian Social Union (CSU) who has been serving as a member of the Bundestag from the state of Bavaria since 2013, representing Main-Spessart.

Political career 
Hoffmann first became a member of the Bundestag in the 2013 German federal election. 

In parliament, Hoffmann has since been a member of the Committee on Legal Affairs and Consumer Protection. Since 2022, he has also been a member of the Parliamentary Oversight Panel (PKGr), which provides parliamentary oversight of Germany’s intelligence services BND, BfV and MAD. That same year, he joined the Commission for the Reform of the Electoral Law and the Modernization of Parliamentary Work, co-chaired by Johannes Fechner and Nina Warken.

References

External links 

 Bundestag biography 

1975 births
Living people
Members of the Bundestag for Bavaria
Members of the Bundestag 2021–2025
Members of the Bundestag 2017–2021
Members of the Bundestag 2013–2017
Politicians from Würzburg
Members of the Bundestag for the Christian Social Union in Bavaria